The WWF North American Heavyweight Championship was a relatively short-lived title in the World Wrestling Federation (WWF, now WWE) from 1979 until 1981. It was established as the WWWF North American Heavyweight Championship on February 13, 1979 before the World Wide Wrestling Federation (WWWF) was renamed to WWF the following month. The inaugural champion was Ted DiBiase and the final champion was Seiji Sakaguchi. 

In March 2018, the now WWE established a new North American championship for their NXT brand, the NXT North American Championship. This new title, however, does not carry the lineage of the promotion's original North American championship.

Reigns

Names

Reigns

See also
 NXT North American Championship
 NWA North American Championship

References

External links 
 WWF North American Heavyweight Title History

WWE championships
New Japan Pro-Wrestling championships
North American professional wrestling championships